The Palanche de la Cretta (or (La) Palantse de la Cretta) is a mountain of the Swiss Pennine Alps, overlooking Evolène in the canton of Valais. It lies north of Mont de l'Etoile.

References

External links
 Palanche de la Cretta on Hikr

Mountains of the Alps
Mountains of Switzerland
Mountains of Valais
Two-thousanders of Switzerland